Charles Barlow may refer to:

Charles A. Barlow (1858–1927), U.S. Representative from California
Charles F. Barlow (1923–2010), American pediatric neurologist
Charles Barlow (businessman) (1905–1979), South African entrepreneur and Somerset cricketer
Charles Barlow (potter) (1881–1950), British artist specialising in ceramics